Luka Ašćerić (born January 10, 1997) is a Serbian–Austrian professional basketball player for ALM Évreux of the LNB Pro B.

Professional career 
Ašćerić played for the domestic team Arkadia Traiskirchen Lions during the 2014–15 season. In 2015, he moved to France where he played for Lille Métropole of the LNB Pro B for two seasons. He also played for French side Hyères-Toulon of the LNB Pro A during 2017–18 season.

In April 2018, Ašćerić signed for the Mega Bemax of the Basketball League of Serbia.

On July 21, 2020, Ašćerić has signed with JL Bourg of LNB Pro A.

On July 10, 2021, Ašćerić has signed with Śląsk Wrocław of the PLK. He missed the entire 2021–22 PLK season due to injury. In August 2022, he signed for French team ALM Évreux.

National team career 
In February 2020, Ašćerić was invited by coach Igor Kokoškov to join Serbian national basketball team for EuroBasket 2021 qualification games against Finland and Georgia.

Personal life 
His father Nedeljko Ašćerić is a professional basketball coach and former player. His father coached him during his stints with Lille Métropole.

References

External links 
 Profile at eurobasket.com
 Player Profile at realgm.com

1997 births
Living people
ABA League players
Austrian expatriate basketball people in Serbia
Austrian men's basketball players
Austrian people of Serbian descent
Basketball League of Serbia players
HTV Basket players
Lille Métropole BC players
JL Bourg-en-Bresse players
KK Mega Basket players
People from Sankt Pölten
Point guards
Serbian expatriate basketball people in Austria
Serbian expatriate basketball people in France
Serbian men's basketball players
Shooting guards
Sportspeople from Lower Austria
Traiskirchen Lions players